Michael Wells (born 3 May 1993) is an Australian people Rugby Union player who currently plays as a loose forward for the  in the National Rugby Championship. As of the 2016 Super Rugby season, he is also a member of the  extended playing squad.

Wells was an Australian schoolboys representative in 2011 and was also a member of the Australia under-20 side which competed in the 2013 IRB Junior World Championship in France.   Since 2014, he has also turned out for the Australia Sevens side, debuting for them at the Gold Coast sevens in his homeland.

Super Rugby statistics

References

1993 births
Living people
Australian rugby union players
Rugby union flankers
Rugby union number eights
Sydney (NRC team) players
Male rugby sevens players
Rugby union players from Sydney
People educated at Saint Ignatius' College, Riverview
Australia international rugby sevens players
ACT Brumbies players
New South Wales Waratahs players
Melbourne Rebels players
Western Force players